Cheiropleuria is a genus of ferns in the family Dipteridaceae. Species are found in both temperate and tropical eastern Asia.

Taxonomy
Cheiropleuria was first described by Carl Borivoj Presl in 1851. The type species Cheiropleuria bicuspis was first described as Polypodium bicuspe by Blume in 1828.

Species
, Plants of the World Online and the Checklist of Ferns and Lycophytes of the World recognized the following species:
Cheiropleuria bicuspis (Blume) C.Presl – widely distributed in temperate and tropical eastern Asia
Cheiropleuria integrifolia (D.C.Eaton ex Hook.) M.Kato, Y.Yatabe, Sahashi & N.Murak. – southern Japan, China (Guangdong, Guangxi), Taiwan
Cheiropleuria parva M.Kato, Y.Yatabe, Sahashi & N.Murak. – Borneo

Phylogeny of Cheiropleuria

References

Gleicheniales
Fern genera